The discography of Joe Bonamassa, an American blues rock musician, consists of 15 studio albums, 18 live albums, three collaboration albums, 30 singles (28 as a lead artist, two as a featured artist), 15 video albums, 13 music videos and 54 other appearances. After growing up in Utica, New York, Bonamassa began his career as a member of the band Bloodline, before beginning his solo career in 2000 with the release of A New Day Yesterday. The album reached number 9 on the US Billboard Blues Albums chart. The guitarist continued to see success in the blues genre, topping the chart with 2002's So, It's Like That and 2006's You & Me, before making his debut on the Billboard 200 in 2007 with Sloe Gin, which reached number 184. Bonamassa's albums have continued to increase in chart success over the years, with The Ballad of John Henry reaching number 103 on the Billboard 200, Black Rock, Dust Bowl and Driving Towards the Daylight reaching the Top 40, and Different Shades of Blue and Blues of Desperation reaching the Top 20. Several of the musician's video albums have also topped the Billboard Music Video Sales chart.

Outside of his solo work, Bonamassa has also collaborated with a wide range of artists. With singer-songwriter Beth Hart he has released three studio albums – Don't Explain in 2011; Seesaw in 2013; and  Black Coffee in 2018 – and one live/video album, Live in Amsterdam in 2014. On the Billboard 200, Don't Explain reached number 120, Seesaw reached number 47 and Live in Amsterdam reached number 87. In 2015, he was also featured on the Betty Davis tribute album Ooh Yea: The Betty Davis Songbook released by Mahalia Barnes and the Soul Mates. Bonamassa has also contributed songs to various other albums – including "Love Conquers All" on the 20 Dates soundtrack, "The Easy Blues" for the John Martyn tribute album Johnny Boy Would Love This: A Tribute to John Martyn, and a cover version of "Lazy" with Jimmy Barnes for Re-Machined: A Tribute to Deep Purple's Machine Head – and been featured on recordings by artists including Joe Lynn Turner, Ozzy Osbourne and Don Airey. Bonamassa is also a member of the hard rock band Black Country Communion alongside Glenn Hughes, Jason Bonham and Derek Sherinian.

In 2020, Bonamassa created Keeping the Blues Alive Records, an independent record label that promotes and supports the talent of blues musicians. Current artists include Dion DiMucci, Joanne Shaw Taylor, Joanna Connor, Larry McCray and others. Bonamassa produces and collaborates on many of the projects.

Albums

Studio albums

Collaborations

Live albums

Singles

As lead artist

As featured artist

Note: Dion also released "You Know It's Christmas" (featuring Bonamassa and co-written with Mike Aquilina) in 2020

Other charted songs

Videos

Video albums

Music videos

Note: Dion released music videos for "Blues Comin' On" & "You Know It's Christmas" (produced with Bonamassa) in 2020.

Other appearances

See also
Bloodline (band)
Black Country Communion discography
Rock Candy Funk Party

References

External links
Joe Bonamassa official website
Joe Bonamassa discography at AllMusic
Joe Bonamassa discography at Discogs

Discographies of American artists
Blues discographies
Rock music discographies